The 2004 Sydney Roosters season was the 97th in the club's history. They competed in the NRL's 2004 Telstra Premiership and finished the regular season 1st, taking out the minor premiership before going on to reach the grand final which they lost to the Bulldogs.

Results

Notable events
Due to a favourable draw, the Sydney Roosters did not play a premiership match in Queensland, although they did play a pre-season match there.
The Sydney Roosters finished at the top of the table joint with the Bulldogs, but won the minor premiership on percentage.
The Roosters beat the Wests Tigers twice in 2004 by scorelines of 22–0 and 56-0 in Rounds 9 and 16 respectively. It was the first time in almost 40 years that a single team had held their opponent scoreless over two matches.
An unsavory incident occurred in Round 3 when a bottle was thrown onto the field as Brett Finch knocked on from the restart in their match against the Bulldogs. He allegedly threw it back to the crowd, and received a warning from the NRL for his actions.
Justin Hodges was sent off in the team's Round 13 loss to the Bulldogs, costing him his place in that year's Queensland State of Origin side.
The Roosters trailed 14–0 at halftime in their Round 19 match against the Dragons before coming back to win 18–14.
Two of the Roosters' losses came against teams that failed to make the finals that year (Parramatta in Round 18 and Cronulla in Round 22). The other three losses were against teams that finished in the top four (Panthers in Round 4, Broncos in Round 5 and Bulldogs in Round 13).
In June 2004 the Roosters were subject to salary cap troubles which resulted in wooden spoon betting being suspended after a bet of $50 was placed on the Roosters to finish last that season. However, the Roosters were cleared of any salary cap wrongdoing.

References

Sydney Roosters seasons
Sydney Roosters season